Penrose is an industrial suburb in Auckland, New Zealand. It is located to the southeast of the city centre, at a distance of about nine kilometres, between the suburbs of Oranga and Mount Wellington, and close to the Mangere Inlet, an arm of the Manukau Harbour.

In 2008, there were 44,975 employees and 4,998 businesses in the Penrose area, 14 per cent of Auckland City's employment, making up seven per cent of its businesses. Of these,  16% were in manufacturing, 14% in wholesale trade, 10% in administrative and support services, 10% in professional, scientific and technical services, 8% in construction and 6% in transport, postal and warehousing business types.

Demographics

Penrose had a population of 843 at the 2018 New Zealand census, an increase of 198 people (30.7%) since the 2013 census, and an increase of 168 people (24.9%) since the 2006 census. There were 297 households, comprising 420 males and 420 females, giving a sex ratio of 1.0 males per female. The median age was 34.7 years (compared with 37.4 years nationally), with 138 people (16.4%) aged under 15 years, 195 (23.1%) aged 15 to 29, 348 (41.3%) aged 30 to 64, and 162 (19.2%) aged 65 or older.

Ethnicities were 42.3% European/Pākehā, 10.0% Māori, 16.0% Pacific peoples, 38.1% Asian, and 1.8% other ethnicities. People may identify with more than one ethnicity.

The percentage of people born overseas was 48.8, compared with 27.1% nationally.

Although some people chose not to answer the census's question about religious affiliation, 35.9% had no religion, 41.6% were Christian, 1.4% had Māori religious beliefs, 4.6% were Hindu, 3.6% were Muslim, 3.9% were Buddhist and 3.2% had other religions.

Of those at least 15 years old, 213 (30.2%) people had a bachelor's or higher degree, and 93 (13.2%) people had no formal qualifications. The median income was $36,400, compared with $31,800 nationally. 120 people (17.0%) earned over $70,000 compared to 17.2% nationally. The employment status of those at least 15 was that 381 (54.0%) people were employed full-time, 72 (10.2%) were part-time, and 27 (3.8%) were unemployed.

History 

The area was purchased from three local Maori Chiefs by The Wiiliams family in the late 1830s, the farm being called Penrose after their home area in Cornwall, England.

The railway line between Auckland and Onehunga running through Penrose (now known as the Onehunga Line) was one of the first Government funded railways in New Zealand, being opened in 1873. It was built by the Auckland provincial government. 

Industry started to flourish in the area from the 1920s, due to its close connection to the main railway line and the main road (Great South Road) with these important transport links later strengthened by the motorway (State Highway 1) built following the same alignment in the 1950s. By this time, around 5,000 workers were employed in the suburb.}

The new motorway and the move of industrial and manufacturing occupations out of older centres like the Auckland CBD soon started a boom in the Penrose-Mount Wellington area. Industry also successfully lobbied for state housing to be built close by, to provide the new area with a supply of labour. To this day, the area remains almost exclusively industrial, with a mix of run-down areas and newly established sites.

Education 
Despite the low local population, Penrose is the site of the former Penrose High School, which in 2008 renamed itself One Tree Hill College, to shed the 'industrial' associations of the name. The school attracts many students from out of the suburb, many of its students coming from as far as 20 km away.

The Auckland Japanese Supplementary School (AJSS; オークランド日本語補習学校 Ōkurando Nihongo Hoshūgakkō), a Japanese supplementary school, holds its classes at One Tree Hill College.

Sport and recreation
Penrose is home to the New Zealand Warriors, who are based at Mount Smart Stadium.

References

External links
Photographs of Penrose held in Auckland Libraries' heritage collections.

Suburbs of Auckland